This article documents the 2010–11 season for North London football club Barnet.

Friendly matches

Competitions

League Two

League table

Matches

FA Cup

Football League Cup

Football League Trophy

Herts Senior Cup

Appearances and goals
As of 6 May 2011.
(Substitute appearances in brackets)

Transfers

References

Barnet F.C. seasons
Barnet